Kamaraj and Konartakhteh District is a district (bakhsh) in Kazerun County, Fars Province, Iran. It was formed from the split of Khesht and Kamaraj District.  At the 2006 census, its population was 11,218, in 2,423 families.  The district has one city: Konartakhteh.  The district has one rural district (dehestan): Kamaraj Rural District.

References 

Kazerun County
Districts of Fars Province